Idool may refer to:
 Idool, Cameroon
 Idool (TV series)